Siepraw  is a village in Myślenice County, Lesser Poland Voivodeship, in southern Poland. It is the seat of the gmina (administrative district) called Gmina Siepraw.

The village has an approximate population of 5,000. It is the location of the Siepraw Ski resort.

References

Villages in Myślenice County